Matias Strandvall (born March 15, 1985 in Helsinki), is a Finnish cross-country skier who has competed at World Cup-level since 2004. He finished 37th in the individual sprint event at the 2010 Winter Olympics in Vancouver, British Columbia, Canada.

Strandvall's best finish at the FIS Nordic World Ski Championships was ninth in the individual sprint at Sapporo in 2007.

His best World Cup finish is third in an individual sprint event at Canada in 2008.

Strandvall's brother Sebastian Strandvall is a football player in the Finnish league.

Cross-country skiing results
All results are sourced from the International Ski Federation (FIS).

Olympic Games

World Championships

World Cup

Season standings

Individual podiums
1 podium – (1 )

References

External links

Finnish male cross-country skiers
Olympic cross-country skiers of Finland
Cross-country skiers at the 2010 Winter Olympics
Swedish-speaking Finns
Sportspeople from Helsinki
1985 births
Living people